Ying Wang or Yingwang may refer to:

Wang Ying (disambiguation), Chinese people with the surname Wang and given name Ying
Prince of Ying (disambiguation) or Ying Wang, royalty or generals from Chinese history carrying this title
King Eagle, a 1971 Hong Kong film by Chang Cheh
Yingwang Subdistrict (英旺乡), a subdistrict in Yichuan County, Shaanxi, China